Alex Edelstein (born January 17, 1969) is a high-tech manager and reality television participant.

Career
Alex Edelstein is currently a Product Manager at Salesforce. Previously he was the founder and Head of Product Development of The Fr8 Company, a web service that integrates SaaS services such as Slack, Salesforce, and DocuSign. Previously, he created Servio (formerly CloudCrowd) a company in the crowdsourcing space that he co-founded with Jordan Ritter in 2009. Before CloudCrowd, he was a real estate developer and the head of Gemstone Development, which was responsible for the ManhattanWest
and Manhattan condominiums.  He previously held engineering and management roles at Cloudmark and Inktomi. He product managed the early versions of Netscape Navigator. Additionally, he was on the original design team for Microsoft Exchange and Microsoft Outlook.

Reality Television
On April 2, 2009, he was featured on the reality TV show The Millionaire Matchmaker.

Community
He provides television analysis on both real estate 
and high-tech topics.  He was on the Board of Directors of Kiva.org, a non-profit company that facilities micro-lending in developing countries.

He graduated from Harvard College.

References

External links 
 The Fr8 Company

Living people
American computer businesspeople
Participants in American reality television series
1969 births
Harvard College alumni